Pneuma Recordings is a drum and bass record label based out of San Francisco, USA, owned by Dj Abstract.

Notable artists
 Dj Abstract
 UFO!
 Subcode
 E-Sassin
 Bitteroot

Discography
PNE-001	- DJ Abstract	            Aura Two / Area Code  (12") 
PNE-002	- DJ Abstract	            Artifice / Curtis Whiles Last Stand  (12") 
PNE-003	- UFO! / Bitteroot         London Cold / Terck  (12") 
PNE-004	- Subcode	                    Silicontrol / Element Coil  (12") 
PNE-005	- One Man Army	    Vertigo / Circuit Breaker  (10") 
PNE-006	- E-Sassin	                    Genome / Future Shock  (12") 
PNE-007	- DJ Abstract	            Fastlane / Sensibility	  (12") 
PNE-008	- DJ Abstract	            Second Thoughts / Sol Train  (12")

See also
 List of record labels
 List of electronic music record labels
 List of jungle and drum n bass record labels

References

American record labels
Drum and bass record labels